Novak Djokovic defeated Gaël Monfils in the final, 6–2, 5–7, 7–6(7–3) to win the singles tennis title at the 2009 Paris Masters. It was his first Paris Masters title, and the first of an eventual record six titles at the event.

Jo-Wilfried Tsonga was the defending champion, but lost to Rafael Nadal in the quarterfinals.

This was the last professional appearance for former world No. 1, two-time major champion, and three-time Paris Masters champion Marat Safin; he lost in the second round to Juan Martín del Potro.

Seeds
All seeds receive a bye into the second round.

Draw

Finals

Top half

Section 1

Section 2

Bottom half

Section 3

Section 4

Qualifying

Seeds

Qualifiers

Draw

First qualifier

Second qualifier

Third qualifier

Fourth qualifier

Fifth qualifier

Sixth qualifier

External links
 Main Draw
 Qualifying Draw

BNP Paribas Masters - Singles
- Singles, 2009 Bnp Paribas Masters